In Germanic paganism, a vé or wēoh (Old English) is a type of shrine, sacred enclosure or other place with religious significance. The term appears in skaldic poetry and in place names in Scandinavia (with the exception of Iceland), often in connection with an Old Norse deity or a geographic feature.

Functions

Andy Orchard says that a vé may have surrounded a temple or have been simply a marked, open place where worship occurred. Orchard points out that Tacitus, in his 1st century CE work Germania, says that the Germanic peoples, unlike the Romans, "did not seek to contain their deities within temple walls."

Etymology
Vé derives from a Common Germanic word meaning sacred or holy, cf. Gothic weihs (holy), Old English wēoh, wīg (idol), German weihen (consecrate, sanctify), German Weihnachten (Christmas). It shares etymology with the phrase Þor vigi ("may Thor hallow" or "may Thor protect") found on the Canterbury Charm, Glavendrup stone, Sønder Kirkeby Runestone, Velanda Runestone and Virring Runestone. The name of the Norse god Vé also shares this etymology.

An alternative word for "sanctuary" is alhs (Gothic alhs, Runic Norse alh, Old High German alah, Anglo-Saxon ealh); for this etymology see Alu (runic).

Attestations

References in Old English literature
The Old English poem Maxims I refers to weos in the following stanza:

Wēoh is also attested in Beowulf as an element in the compound name Wēohstan and as an element in the word wígweorþunga, referring to the act of honouring idols.

References in Norse literature
References to a vé are made in Old Norse literature without emphasis. For example, the Prose Edda quotes a verse of the Skáldskaparmál of Skúli Þórsteinsson and mentions a vé:

Toponyms

Examples of -vé appearing in toponyms after the names of Norse gods and goddesses:
Dís - Disevid in Östergötland in Sweden.
Freyja - Härnevi in Uppland, and probably Järnevi in Östergötland, Sweden.
Freyr - Frösvi in Östergötland, Sweden.
Njörðr - Nalavi in Närke and two locations named Mjärdevi, in Sweden.
Odin - Odensvi in Närke, Sweden. In Denmark, all 5 place names using the -vé suffix focus on Odin (examples include Odense, Denmark).
Rindr - Vrinnevid in Östergötland, Sweden.
Skaði - possibly Skövde in Västergötland, Skadevi in Uppland, and a number of locations named Sked(e)vi in Sweden.
Thor - Torsvi in Uppland, Sweden.
Ullr - numerous locations named Ull(e)vi or Ullavi in Sweden.

Eight old farms in Norway have the name Vé (in Flå, Norderhov, Ringsaker, Sande, Stamnes, Tveit, Tysnes and Årdal). It is also common as the first element in compounded names: Vébólstaðr "the farm with a ve"), Védalr ("the valley with a ve"), Véló ("the holy meadow"), Vésetr ("the farm with a ve"), Véstaðir ("the farm with a ve"), Vésteinn ("the holy stone"), Vévatn ("the holy lake"), Véøy ("the holy island").

The names of the Danish city of Viborg, Jutland, and the former Finnish city of Vyborg, located along the trade route from Scandinavia to Byzantium, are also considered related.

See also
Heathen hof
Norse rituals

Notes

References

 Hellquist, E. (1922): Svensk etymologisk ordbok. C. W. K. Gleerups förlag, Lund.
 
 Finnur, Jónsson (1923). Den Oldnorske og Oldislandske Litteraturs Historie. København, G.E.C Gads forlag.
 Orchard, Andy (1997). Dictionary of Norse Myth and Legend. Cassell. 
 Simek, Rudolf (2007), translated by Angela Hall. Dictionary of Northern Mythology. D.S. Brewer. 
 Snorri Sturluson (translated by Anthony Faulkes) (1995). Snorri Sturluson: Edda. First published in 1987. Everyman. .

External links
 Diagram showing a Vé at Jelling from Jones & Pennick, A History of Pagan Europe, p. 120.

Germanic paganism
Paganism in Europe